Muhammad ibn al-Qa'im also known as Muhammad Dhakirat was an Abbasid prince, son of Abbasid caliph Al-Qa'im. He was designated as heir apparent by his father in the mid-eleventh century CE but died before his father.

Biography
Muhammad was the son of Abbasid caliph Al-Qa'im who reigned from 1031 to 1075 and the grandson of caliph al-Qadir. His full name was Muhammad ibn Abu Ja'far al-Qa'im ibn Ahmad al-Qadir. He was known in Baghdad as Muhammad Dhakirat.

In 1030, his grandfather, al-Qadir named his son Abu Ja'far al-Qa'im, as his heir, a decision taken completely independently of the Buyīd emirs. During the first half of al-Qa'im's long reign, hardly a day passed in the capital without turmoil. Frequently the city was left without a ruler; the Buyīd emir was often forced to flee the capital. While the Seljuk influence grew, Dawud Chaghri Beg married his daughter, Khadija Arslan Khatun, to al-Qa'im in 1056.

His father, al-Qa'im nominated him heir apparent in mid eleventh century however he died during his father's reign and his father then nominated his son, Abdallāh (future Al-Muqtadi) as next Heir-apparent. In 1075 al-Muqtadi succeeded his grandfather, when al-Qa'im died at the age of 73–74. Al-Muqtadi was born to Muhammad Dhakirat, the son of caliph al-Qa'im, and an Armenian slave girl called Urjuwuan.

References

Sources
 
 
 
This text is adapted from William Muir's public domain, The Caliphate: Its Rise, Decline, and Fall.

Sons of Abbasid caliphs
Heirs apparent who never acceded
11th century in Iraq
1030s births
1060s deaths
11th-century people from the Abbasid Caliphate
Year of birth uncertain
Year of death uncertain